Jessie Montgomery (born December 8, 1981, New York City) is an American composer, chamber musician, and music educator. Her compositions focus on the vernacular, improvisation, language, and social justice.

Early life and education 
Jessie Montgomery was raised in Manhattan's Lower East Side by playwright and performer Robbie McCauley and composer Ed Montgomery. She began her violin studies at the Third Street Music School Settlement. She holds a bachelor's degree in violin performance from the Juilliard School, and completed a master's degree in Composition for Film and Multimedia at New York University in 2012.

Starting in 1999, Montgomery became involved with the Sphinx Organization, a Detroit-based nonprofit that supports young African American and Latino string players. After receiving multiple Sphinx awards and grants as a young performer and composer, she now serves as composer-in-residence for the Sphinx Virtuosi, the organization's professional touring ensemble.

Career 
Montgomery devoted her early career to performance and to teaching at organizations such as Community MusicWorks in Providence, Rhode Island.  She co-founded the string ensemble PUBLIQuartet in 2010, and performed with the Catalyst Quartet until January 2021. She has increasingly focused on composing solo, chamber, vocal, and orchestral works. Montgomery has completed commissions for the Metropolitan Museum of Art, the Orpheus Chamber Orchestra, the Albany Symphony, the Sphinx Organization, the Joyce Foundation, the National Choral Society, and The Guild of Carillonneurs in North America. She has received additional grants and awards from the ASCAP Foundation, Chamber Music America, American Composers Orchestra, and the Sorel Organization. Her music has been performed by the Philharmonia Orchestra, Atlanta Symphony, Dallas Symphony, Minnesota Orchestra, and San Francisco Symphony, and choreographed by the Dance Theatre of Harlem.

In 2014, New York Times music critic Anthony Tommasini highlighted her piece Banner for solo string quartet and string ensemble, commissioned by the Sphinx Organization and the Joyce Foundation as a response to the 200th anniversary of "The Star-Spangled Banner," for "daringly transform[ing] the anthem, folding it into a teeming score that draws upon American folk and protest songs, and anthems from around the world, including Mexican, Puerto Rican and Cuban, to create a musical melting pot." In 2019, Fanfare also discussed her multicultural New York influences, noting that listeners could expect to hear "English consort, samba, mbira, Zimbabwean dance, swing, techno... occasionally veering, somewhat ecstatically, towards a modern jazz jam session" in her work.

In 2016, Montgomery was elected to the board of Chamber Music America. In 2021, she became the Chicago Symphony Orchestra's Mead Composer-in-Residence.

She is part of the duo big dog little dog with bassist Eleonore Oppenheim. New Amsterdam released their first record in 2019.

Discography 

 Strum: Music for Strings (2015), Azica 71302

Works 

 Banner (2014), for solo string quartet and string orchestra
 Banner (2017), for solo string quartet and chamber orchestra
 Break Away (2013), for string quartet
 Caught by the Wind (2016), for orchestra
 Coincident Dances (2017), for orchestra
 D Major Jam! (2020), for string ensemble
 Divided (2022), for solo cello and string orchestra
 Duo for Violin and Cello (2015), for violin and cello
 Five Freedom Songs (2021), for voice, percussion, and string orchestra
 Hymn for Everyone (2021), for orchestra
 L.E.S. Characters (2021), concerto for solo viola and orchestra
 Lunar Songs (2019), for voice and string quartet
 Overture (2022), for orchestra
 Passacaglia (2021), for flute quartet
 Passage (2019), for flute, clarinet, horn, string quartet
 Shift, Change, Turn (2019), for chamber orchestra
 Source Code (2013), for string quartet or string orchestra
 Soul Force (2015), for orchestra
 Starburst (2012), for string orchestra
 Strum (2006 rev. 2012), for string quartet/quintet or string orchestra
 Tower City (2018), for solo carillon
 Records from a Vanishing City (2016), for orchestra
 Rhapsody no. 1 for solo violin (2014), for solo violin
 Rhapsody no. 2 for solo violin (2020), for solo violin
 Rhapsody no. 1 for solo viola (2021), for solo viola
 Rhapsody no. 2 for solo viola (2021), for solo viola
 Rounds (2022), for piano and string orchestra
 Voodoo Dolls (2008), for string quartet or quintet

References

External links 
 

1981 births
Living people
21st-century American women musicians
21st-century classical composers
21st-century women composers
African-American classical composers
American classical composers
African-American women classical composers
American women classical composers
Composers for carillon
Composers for violin
Juilliard School alumni
Musicians from New York City
New York University alumni
Women classical violinists
African-American women musicians
21st-century African-American women
21st-century African-American musicians
20th-century African-American people
20th-century African-American women